Zunhua is a county-level city in the northeast of Hebei province, China, bordering Tianjin to the west. It is under the administration of the prefecture-level city of Tangshan. Historic sites include the Eastern Qing Tombs (Qing Dongling).

Administrative divisions
Zunhua has jurisdiction over 2 subdistricts, 13 towns, and 12 townships.

Subdistricts 

Towns 
Zunhua contains the following 13 towns:

 
 
 Malanyu
 
 
 
 
 
 
 
 
 
 

Townships 
Zunhua contains the following 12 townships, of which, 3 are Manchu ethnic townships:














Geography 
Most of the city's terrain consists of small mountains, hills, and valleys, and a number of rivers, such as the Sha, Li, Lin, and Weijin flow through the city. Significant mountains in Zunhua include Jiufeng Mountain, Taohua Mountain, Wolong Mountain, and Huanghua Mountain.

Climate

Demographics 
As of 2017, Zunhua had a population of 794,000, of which, 243,200 resided in urban areas. 114,500 people in Zunhua are ethnic minorities, the largest number in Tangshan.

Economy 
Zunhua is home to mineral deposits containing minerals such as iron, manganese, chromium, copper, lead, zinc, gold, and dolomite.

Energy 
141,100 people in Zunhua have access to natural gas, of which, 90,200 have access to LPG.

Transportation 
A number of railways and highways pass through the city.

Road 
The following highways pass through Zunhua:

 National Highway 112
 
 Bangkuan Highway
 Zunbao Highway

Rail 
The following railroads pass through Zunhua:

 Daqin Railway
 Tangzun Railway
 Zunxiao Railway

See also
Eastern Qing Tombs

References

http://www.china.org.cn/english/kuaixun/75232.htm
https://web.archive.org/web/20070819215604/http://www.zunhua.gov.cn:80/enews.cfm?lanmu=liuyou&type=A%20Survey%20of%20Tour%20Business&id=21
Seventeen die from China gas leak (BBC) - Gas leak at steel plant in Zunhua, December 2008

External links

County-level cities in Hebei
Tangshan